Matlotliso Lineo Lydia Ntoane (also Matlotliso Lineo Khechane-Ntoane) (12 May 1966 – 22 December 2017 in the Kingdom of Lesotho ) was a Basotho diplomat.

Life

Ntoane joined the public service in the Kingdom of Lesotho in 1989 and worked in different ministries including Health, Local Government and Public Service. She holds a degree in sociology and in public administration. Ntoane was for six years the chair of the Lesotho Revenue Authority (LRA) Board. She also represented the Lesotho government in the Lesotho National Development Corporation (LNDC) and on the board of the Imperial Fleet Services company. In 2008 Ntoane became High Commissioner in Pretoria, South Africa and moved 2013 as ambassador to Berlin, Germany, succeeding Makase Nyaphisi. She was married to Rev. Kenny Ntoane from the Anglican Diocese of Lesotho and had a son and a daughter.

Career 
 1989 - 1997: Official at the Ministry of Public Administration
 1997 - 2000: Head inspector at the Ministry of Local Government and Chieftainship Affairs
 2000 - 2008: Deputy secretary at the Ministry of Finance and Development Planning
 2004/2005: Chairperson Governing Board Lesotho Revenue Authority (Ministry of Finance and Development Planning)
 29 August 2005: Appointed Chief Executive - Support Services leading the Human Resources and general administration of The Ministry of Finance and Development Training.
 2007 The Lesotho Revenue Authority (LRA), LRA Board Chair
 18 September 2008 - 2010: High Commissioner of Lesotho to South Africa (residence in Pretoria, South Africa)
 6 October 2008: High Commissioner of Lesotho (with residence in Pretoria) to Botswana
 24 October 2008: High Commissioner of Lesotho (with residence in Pretoria) to Namibia
 9 June 2009: High Commissioner of Lesotho (with residence in Pretoria) to Mauritius
 1 October 2009: High Commissioner of Lesotho (with residence in Pretoria) to Swaziland
 9 November 2009: High Commissioner of Lesotho (with residence in Pretoria) to Zambia
 27 October 2010: Ambassador of Lesotho (with residence in Pretoria) to Zimbabwe
 26 January 2011: High Commissioner of Lesotho (with residence in Pretoria) to Seychelles
 18 July 2013: Ambassador Extraordinary and Plenipotentiary of Lesotho to Germany (residence Berlin, Germany)
 14 August 2013: Resident Representative to IAEA
 5 September 2013: Permanent Delegate to UNESCO 
 2013: Permanent Representative to UNIDO
 12 December 2013: Ambassador Extraordinary and Plenipotentiary of Lesotho (with residence in Berlin) to the Holy See
 27 June 2014: Ambassador Extraordinary and Plenipotentiary of Lesotho (with residence in Berlin) to the Russian Federation
 8 July 2014: Ambassador Extraordinary and Plenipotentiary of Lesotho (with residence in Berlin) to France
 10 December 2014: Ambassador Extraordinary and Plenipotentiary of Lesotho (with residence in Berlin) to Austria
 14 January 2015: Ambassador Extraordinary and Plenipotentiary of Lesotho (with residence in Berlin) to Poland
 24 April 2015: Ambassador Extraordinary and Plenipotentiary of Lesotho (with residence in Berlin) to Monaco
 6 December 2016: Recalled as ambassador and returned to Lesotho.

References

External links 

 Video of accreditation to the Russian Federation, 27 June 2014

1966 births
2017 deaths
Lesotho diplomats
Ambassadors of Lesotho to Austria
Ambassadors of Lesotho to Germany
Ambassadors of Lesotho to Russia
Ambassadors of Lesotho to Poland
Ambassadors of Lesotho to France
Ambassadors of Lesotho to Monaco
Ambassadors of Lesotho to the Holy See
Ambassadors of Lesotho to Ukraine